The Western Mindanao State University (WMSU) is a state university located in Zamboanga City, Philippines. It has two campuses: the main campus of 79,000 square metres and 9,147 square metres in the city proper, and the satellite campus of 200,000 square metres in San Ramon about 20 kilometers from the city. Campuses comprising the external studies units are in the provinces of Zamboanga del Sur and Zamboanga Sibugay. It has a student population of over 32,000, regular faculty members of over 600 and over 200 administrative personnel.

It has 15 colleges, one institute and two autonomous campuses offering undergraduate and postgraduate courses specializing in accounting, education, engineering, nursing, arts and humanities, social work, science and mathematics. Along with these major fields of concentration, WMSU also offers courses in agriculture, architecture, forestry, home economics, nutrition and dietetics, computer science, criminology, Asian and Islamic Studies and special degree courses for foreign students. It also offers external studies and non-formal education courses.

WMSU ranked sixth among 68 universities all over the country, according to a survey on the Top Academic Institutions in the Philippines conducted by the Commission on Higher Education. The university's College of Teacher Education is a Center for Development; the College of Architecture is a Center of Development; and the College of Social Work and Community Development was awarded the Best School for Social Work in the Philippines.

History
With the cessation of the hostilities that marked the end of the Spanish–American War in 1898, Filipino and American educators agreed that the best way to rebuild a devastated nation was through the establishment of a sound education system. Eight normal schools were then established in the Philippines by the Americans. One of them was the Zamboanga Normal School established in 1904. As a secondary school, the Zamboanga Normal School offered a general academic curriculum under the Department of Mindanao and Sulu primarily designed to cater to the needs of cultural minorities in the provinces of Cotabato, Davao, Lanao, Sulu, and Zamboanga.

In June 1921, the secondary normal curriculum of the Zamboanga Normal School had to be phased out for lack of enrollees. It was re-opened the following year and produced its first batch of graduates in 1926. Until the end of school year 1939–1940, the general secondary academic and normal curricula continued to be simultaneously offered. As a result of the opening of the Zamboanga City High School in 1939, the general secondary academic curriculum was discontinued but was offered at the college level. It was briefly disrupted with the outbreak of the Second World War.

After the war, the school resumed operations enabling those who started first year in the two-year collegiate normal curriculum before the war to continue as sophomore students. In April 1946 they were awarded the Elementary Teacher's Certificate (E.T.C.). The secondary normal curriculum was offered only during the summer term until 1952.

Upon its conversion to the Zamboanga Normal College on June 17, 1961,. by virtue of Republic Act No. 3272, the Zamboanga Normal College was placed under the direct supervision of the Bureau of Public Schools (BPS) until its autonomy in 1963. Gradually, it started to offer new degree programs.

The Zamboanga del Norte Agricultural College was the former name of the Tampilisan campus of Western Mindanao State University. The passage of Republic Act No. 3889 on June 18, 1964, caused the conversion of the Zamboanga del Norte National Agricultural School in Liloy, Zamboanga del Norte, to become a college known as Zamboanga del Norte Agricultural College.

The amendment of Republic Act No. 3272 on June 26, 1969 by Republic Act No. 5492 resulted in the conversion of the Zamboanga Normal School into the Zamboanga State College. Considering the demands of a growing population in a rapidly changing society and upon the initiative of Western Mindanao Regional Commissioner Rear Admiral Romulo Espaldon, President Ferdinand E. Marcos signed Presidential Decree No. 1427 on June 10, 1978, elevating the Zamboanga State College into the Western Mindanao State University.

Since its conversion into a state university, the following university presidents have taken its leadership: Dr. Juanito A. Bruno, as Acting President (1978–1986); Dr. Bernabela L. Ko, as first full-fledged president (1986–1991); Dr. Erdulfo B. Fernando (1991–1997); Dr. Eldigario D. Gonzales, DPA, CSEE (1997–2007); Dr. Grace Rebollos, the university's first summa cum laude graduate (2007–2012); Dr. Milabel Enriquez-Ho (2012–2020); Dr. Ma. Carla Ochotorena (2020–Present). Today, WMSU has a total of 1,000 teaching and administrative support staff catering to over 20,000 students.

The university's College of Teacher Education and College of Forestry have been designated as a Centers of Development by the Commission on Higher Education.

Campuses

Main campuses
 Main Campus, Normal Road, Baliwasan, Zamboanga City
 Campus B, San Jose Road, Baliwasan, Zamboanga City

Satellite campuses
 San Ramon Campus, San Ramon, Zamboanga City
 Malangas Campus, Malangas, Zamboanga Sibugay
 Curuan Campus, Curuan, Zamboanga City

Former campuses
 Tampilisan Campus, Tampilisan, Zamboanga del Norte
now Jose Rizal Memorial State University
 Dumingag Campus, Dumingag, Zamboanga del Sur
now Josefina H. Cerilles State College

External Studies Unit (ESU)
 Alicia, Zamboanga Sibugay
 Aurora, Zamboanga del Sur
 Diplahan, Zamboanga Sibugay
 Imelda, Zamboanga Sibugay
 Ipil, Zamboanga Sibugay
 Mabuhay, Zamboanga Sibugay
 Molave, Zamboanga del Sur
 Naga, Zamboanga Sibugay
 Olutanga, Zamboanga Sibugay
 Pagadian City, Zamboanga del Sur
 Siay, Zamboanga Sibugay
 Tungawan, Zamboanga Sibugay

Autonomous campuses
 Curuan Campus, Zamboanga City
 Malangas Campus, Zamboanga Sibugay

Notable faculty and alumni
 Evangelina Macaraeg Macapagal, the former First Lady of the Republic of the Philippines and mother of the former President Gloria Macapagal Arroyo. Macapagal is an alumna of the College of Teacher Education of the University.
Rear Admiral Romulo Espaldon, first Regional Commissioner of Region IX and first Minister of Muslim Affairs. Espaldon was awarded a Doctorate of Humanities honoris causa for his role in elevating Zamboanga State College into Western Mindanao State University.

See also
Zamboanga del Sur Agricultural College
Zamboanga del Norte Agricultural College

References

External links
Official website

Educational institutions established in 1965
State universities and colleges in the Philippines
Universities and colleges in Zamboanga City
Mindanao Association State Colleges and Universities Foundation
Philippine Association of State Universities and Colleges
1965 establishments in the Philippines